Luis Escobar y Kirkpatrick, 7th Marquess of Marismas del Guadalquivir (5 September 1908 – 16 February 1991), was a Spanish nobleman and actor.

He was an actor, playwright, and theatre director who advanced the interests of Teatro María Guerrero, Teatro Español, and Teatro Eslava. A flamboyant aristocrat, he was particularly known to have played el marqués de Leguineche (the Marquess of Leguineche) in Luis García Berlanga's comedy trilogy: La Escopeta Nacional (1978), Patrimonio Nacional (1981) and Nacional III (1982). In 1950, he directed La honradez de la cerradura, being nominated at the 1951 Cannes Film Festival.

Escobar never married and was openly homosexual, especially after Spanish democracy was restored in 1975. His niece, María Victoria Escobar y Cancho, succeeded him in the Marquessate of Marismas del Guadalquivir at his death in 1991.

Selected filmography

Film
 La Escopeta Nacional (1978)
 Patrimonio Nacional (1981)
 Nacional III (1982)
 La Colmena (1982)

Director
 Malibran's Song (1951)

See also 
 Spanish nobility

References

External links

1908 births
1991 deaths
Spanish nobility
Spanish male dramatists and playwrights
Spanish male film actors
Spanish gay writers
Male actors from Madrid
20th-century Spanish dramatists and playwrights
20th-century Spanish male actors
20th-century Spanish male writers
20th-century Spanish LGBT people